Legnephora is a genus of flowering plants, consisting of five climbing species, found in Malesia and Australia. The name comes from ancient Greek, referring to a feature of the fruit anatomy being “border bearing”.

Species
 Legnephora acuta
 Legnephora microcarpa
 Legnephora minutiflora
 Legnephora moorei
 Legnephora philippinensis

References

Menispermaceae
Menispermaceae genera